"Said I Loved You...But I Lied" is a song by American pop music singer Michael Bolton. The song was co-written and co-produced by Bolton and Robert John "Mutt" Lange. Released as the first single from his ninth album, The One Thing (1993), the single topped the American and Canadian adult contemporary charts, reached the top 10 in the United States and in three other countries, and was certified Gold by the Recording Industry Association of America.

The song earned Bolton a Grammy nomination in the category Best Male Pop Vocal performance at the 37th Grammy Awards. In 2011, Bolton performed a duet version of this ballad for his compilation album, Gems: The Duets Album, with Agnes Monica.

Chart performance
"Said I Loved You...But I Lied" reached the US top 40 in November 1993 and eventually became Bolton's seventh and most recent top-ten hit on the Billboard Hot 100 when it peaked at number six in early 1994. The song also spent 12 weeks at number one on the Billboard Hot Adult Contemporary Tracks chart, the singer's eighth chart-topper on this listing. Outside the United States, the single peaked at number two on the Australian Singles Chart, number three on Canada's RPM Top Singles chart, number four on Portugal's AFP chart, number 13 on the New Zealand Singles Chart, and number 15 on the UK Singles Chart. It also reached number one on Canada's RPM Adult Contemporary chart.

Music video

The video was shot in Phoenix, Arizona and Alstrom Point, Utah, and was directed by Rebecca Blake.

Charts

Weekly charts

Year-end charts

Decade-end charts

Certifications

Release history

References

External links
 Single release info at discogs.com

1993 singles
1993 songs
Columbia Records singles
Michael Bolton songs
Song recordings produced by Robert John "Mutt" Lange
Songs written by Michael Bolton
Songs written by Robert John "Mutt" Lange